XHPAS-FM is a radio station on 91.7 FM in Mulegé, Baja California Sur.

History
XHPAS received its concession on February 26, 1996.

References

Radio stations in Baja California Sur
Radio stations established in 1996